Michael Mitaki (born: 23 December 1961) is a sailor from Piraeus, Greece. who represented his country at the 1992 Summer Olympics in Barcelona, Spain as crew member in the Soling. With helmsman Tassos Boudouris and fellow crew member Dimitrios Deligiannis they took the 20th place.

References

Living people
1959 births
Sailors at the 1992 Summer Olympics – Soling
Olympic sailors of Greece
Greek male sailors (sport)
Sailors (sport) from Piraeus